"Desert Moon" is a song written and performed by Dennis DeYoung, a founding member of Styx, from his debut solo album of the same name in 1984. The song was originally intended to be a Styx song until the band broke up. The single reached the #10 position in the US Billboard Hot 100 during the fall of that year, and ended up at #97 on the Billboard top 100 hits for the year 1984.

The music video for the song, directed by Jack Cole, was filmed partly at the train depot and other historic buildings in and around Santa Paula, California.

Chart performance

References

1984 debut singles
1984 songs
Dennis DeYoung songs
Songs written by Dennis DeYoung
A&M Records singles